Leština may refer to places in the Czech Republic:

Leština (Šumperk District), a municipality and village in the Olomouc Region
Leština (Ústí nad Orlicí District), a municipality and village in the Pardubice Region
Leština u Světlé, a municipality and village in the Vysočina Region
Leština, a village and part of Kozlov (Havlíčkův Brod District) in the Vysočina Region
Leština, a village and part of Malé Březno (Ústí nad Labem District) in the Ústí nad Labem Region
Leština, a village and part of Markvartice (Jičín District) in the Hradec Králové Region
Leština, a village and part of Slapsko in the South Bohemian Region
Leština, a village and part of Strmilov in the Vysočina Region

See also
Leštinka (disambiguation)